Juan Andrés may refer to:

 Juan Andrés (1740–1817), writer, Jesuit and historian
 Juan Andrés (convert), Moorish scholar
 Juan Andres (Burrul), priest and mathematician

See also